Hadong County (Hadong-gun) is a county in South Gyeongsang Province, South Korea. It is on the far-west side of the province, bordering South Jeolla Province. The county office is located at Hadeong-eup.

History
The county of Hadong was called Dasachon ("county of much sand") when it was a part of the Jin state, later becoming a part of Nangnoguk, one of twelve statelets of the Byeonhan confederacy. According to the History of the Three Kingdoms, the region was called Handasa-gun, then changed into Hadong-gun in 757 CE, during the reign of King Gyeongdeok of Silla. During the Goryeo dynasty, the area was known as Hadong-hyeon. In 1414, during the reign of the Joseon-era King Taejong, it became known as Hanamhyeon with Namhaehyeon. It was raised to the status of Hadongdohobu in 1740, in the thirtieth year of King Sukjong's reign. During the Korean War the region was the site of a North Korean attack on US Army forces, the Hadong Ambush.

 1702: Agyang-myeon (악양면, 岳陽面) added to Hadong-gun
 April 1, 1914: Seo-myeon and Geumyang-myeon added
 January 1, 1915: Part of Seomjin-ri, Daap-myeon, Gwangyang-gun (광양군, 光陽郡), South Jeolla Province added
 1917: Naehoengbo-myeon renamed to Hoengcheon-myeon; Deokyang-myeon renamed to Jingyo-myeon
 January 1, 1933: Geumyang-myeon was abolished and incorporated into Jingyo-myeon and Geumnam-myeon, formerly Nam-myeon
 October 1, 1938: Hadong-myeon elevated to Hadong-eup

Local sights and attractions
Nestled between the Seomjin River and Mount Jiri, the county is a popular destination for both domestic and foreign tourists who enjoy nature. Parts of the Jirisan National Park lie within the county and form the county's notable hilly, mountainous landscape.

The Ssanggyesa (Ssangye Temple) is a notable historic temple of the Jogye Order of Korean Buddhism and is a designated National Treasure.

Pak Gyeongni's 16-volume novel Land is partly set in the village of Pyeongsa-ri in Agyang-myeon, Hadong County. A replica of the fictional Choi family's home was built there to commemorate the author's legacy.

Green tea
Hadong has been famous for its green tea since the Silla era, when an envoy brought green tea seeds from the Tang Empire to be planted locally. The local government has historically promoted this as a major local attraction, including sponsoring a tourism advertisement that aired on CNN in 2007. The annual "wild tea" festival, lasting 25 days, takes place during May and June.

Development
While much of Korea has experienced an explosion of industrial development, Hadong remains a destination for those who wish to escape the bustle of city living. However, a lack of activity in the industrial sector has left the government with little incentive to expanding the sometimes inadequate existing road infrastructure. A petition for the allocation of funds for new road construction was signed by a number of Hadong residents.

Former South Korean president Lee Myung-bak has recently announced plans for the construction of a Gyeongsangnam-do leisure resort palace in Hadong.

Climate

Notable people
Jeong Gi-ryong
Yi Byeong-ju, a novelist, journalist, and reporter
Jeong Ho-seung
Kang Man-soo
Jeong Gongchae, who won the 1960 Contemporary Literature (Hyundae Munhak) Award for poetry for "Coal" and "Freedom"

Schools
High schools

Middle schools
Agyang Middle School

Twin towns – sister cities
Hadong is twinned with:

  Anyang, South Korea 
  Gwangyang, South Korea 
  Geoje, South Korea 
  Seongdong-gu, South Korea 
  Haeundae-gu, South Korea 
  Zhangqiu, China 
  Ya'an, China 
  Zhangjiajie, China

References

External links
County government website 

 
Counties of South Gyeongsang Province